André Cunha may refer to:

 André Cunha (Portuguese footballer) (born 1978), Portuguese football manager and former midfielder
 André Cunha (Brazilian footballer) (born 1979), Brazilian football right-back

See also
 Andrés Cunha (born 1976), Uruguayan football referee